Julio Velasco (born 9 February 1952) is an Argentine former professional volleyball player and coach. He's had Italian citizenship obtained in 1992. Velasco was inducted into the Volleyball Hall of Fame in 2005. Velasco currently serves as a sports director for the Italian Volleyball Federation.

Career

Player
Julio Velasco began playing volleyball at the age of 15 for National University of La Plata Club.

Coach
Velasco became assistant coach on the Argentina national men's team from 1981 to 1983.

In 1983 he was invited to coach for Tre Valli Jesi in Italy, staying until 1985. He coached at Panini Modena 1985-1989 and led them to four Italian national championships in 1986-1989.

In 1989 he was appointed head coach of the Italy men's national team leading them to unprecedented successes.
His first trophy with the Italian team was at the 1989 Men's European Volleyball Championship in Sweden, where they topped their preliminary group with only one loss and went through the knockout stage up to the final where they beat 3–1 the host side to win their first ever official tournament.

But it was in 1990 that Velasco helped Italy to reach the top the world, leading them to win the World Championship in Brazil: in the knockout stage Italy beat Argentina 3–0 in the quarterfinals, the host Brazil 3-2 in the semifinals and eventually Cuba 3–1 in the championship final to win their first ever title as world champions.

During his tenure as Italy's coach Velasco won two more European Championships, another World Championship and five World Leagues, in addition to other minor trophies like the FIVB World Grand Champions Cup, Mediterranean Games, FIVB World Cup and World Super Challenge.
Velasco also took the Italian men’s team to win its first silver medal history FIPAV in the 1996 Summer Olympics.

After the 1996 Summer Olympics, where the Italians won silver, he switched to the Italy women's team, from 1996 to 1997, coaching them to a Gold Medal at the Mediterranean Games. He coached the Czech Republic men's national team in 2001. He returned to Italy to coach the Copra Piacenza club in 2002.
In 2008 he was selected to coach the Spain men's national team, winning with them the 2009 European Volleyball League.
In 2011, Velasco was signed as the head coach of the Iran men's national team. He became coach of the Argentina men's national team before his contract with the Iranian national team expired on 1 March 2014, after winning two Asian Championships. This change of teams was due to the request of the people and the president of Argentina, and was approved by the Iranian volleyball confederation because of Iranians’ respect for their coach.
He led the Argentinian team to win the 2015 Pan American Games. Velasco was appointed head coach of Modena Volley for the 2018/2019 season.

Administrator
During the season 1998–99 Velasco was General Director of UEFA Cup winner S.S. Lazio, and in 2000 he moved to Massimo Moratti's Inter Milan.

Honours
Ferro:
 4 Serie A1: 1979, 1980, 1981, 1982

Modena:
 4 SuperLega: 1986, 1987, 1988, 1989
 3 Coppe Italia: 1986, 1988, 1989
 1 Coppa delle Coppe: 1986
 1 Supercoppa italia: 2018

Individual awards
 1990 FIVB World Championship - Best Coach
 1991 Medal of Merit Sport Organization Italy
 1993 FIVB World Grand Champions Cup - Best Coach
 1995 FIVB World Cup - Best Coach
 2000 Konex Award - Technical Director
 2012 Società Italiana Medici Manager - Technical Award
 2014 Coach of the Year in Iran
 2022 CEV - Lifetime Achievement Award

Orders
  CONI: Golden Palm of Technical Merit: Palma d'oro al Merito Tecnico: 2018

  President of Italy: Grand Cross of the Order of Merit of the Italian Republic: 2019

About him
He has discussed coaching with football mastermind Pep Guardiola multiple times. When he lived in Italy, Guardiola once travelled hundreds of kilometres so that he could meet Argentinian volleyball coach Julio Velasco personally, simply because he had seen him in a TV interview and wanted to learn from him.

References

External links

 
 Coach profile at Volleyhall.org
 
 Coach profile at LegaVolley.it 
 Coach profile at Volleybox.net

1952 births
Living people
Naturalised citizens of Italy
Sportspeople from La Plata
Argentine men's volleyball players
Argentine volleyball coaches
Argentine expatriate sportspeople in Italy
Argentine expatriate sportspeople in the Czech Republic
Argentine expatriate sportspeople in Spain
Argentine expatriate sportspeople in Iran